Himanshi Khurana (born 27 November 1991) is an Indian model, actress and singer who works in Punjabi films. She appeared in the Punjabi movie Sadda Haq. In 2019, she participated in the reality show Bigg Boss 13 as a contestant.

Early life 
Khurana was born on 27 November 1991 and hails from Kiratpur Sahib, Punjab. She considers her mother, Suneet Kaur, as a strong motivation in her life.

Career 
Khurana started her modelling career at the age of 16 when she became Miss Ludhiana. She was one of the finalists in Miss PTC Punjabi 2010. In the same year she won Miss North Zone contest organised in Chandigarh.

She made her debut in the Punjabi Music industry with the song "Jodi - Big Day Party" (Panjabi MC & Kuldeep Manak) in 2010. Later, in 2012, she starred in the music videos for (Fasli Bateray) by (Feroz Khan) and Izhaar (Harjot). In 2013, Khurana was seen in Soch (Hardy Sandhu) and the hit movie Sadda Haq. The year 2015 proved to be a very successful year for Khurana as she worked with many singers, including Jassi Gill, Badshah, J Star, Ninja, Mankirt Aulakh and others. In March 2016 she starred alongside Sukh-E (Muzical Doctorz) in Sad Song. In 2018, Khurana made her debut as a singer with song High Standard.

Khurana made her debut in Punjabi cinema as an actor with the Punjabi movie Sadda Haq which helped her to gain fame. Although her first Bollywood film was Jeet Lengey Jahaan (2012). She then appeared as a lead role in Punjabi movie Leather Life (featuring Aman Dhaliwal as male lead). 2015 Punjabi language film 2 Bol also features Khurana as a lead actress. She also acted in six south Indian Movies - 2 Kannada, 2 Tamil, 1 Telugu, 1 Malayalam.

In November 2019, Khurana participated as a celebrity contestant in the thirteenth season of the Indian version of the reality TV show Big Brother, Bigg Boss.

Personal life
In November 2019, Khurana confirmed on Bigg Boss 13 that she is in a committed relationship with her boyfriend of nine years named Chow. In January 2020, she confirmed on Twitter that her relationship had ended with her fiancé. She is dating her Bigg Boss co-contestant Asim Riaz since January 2020.

Media 
Himanshi Khurana was ranked in the Chandigarh Times Most Desirable Woman at No. 2 in 2016 as well as 2017, at No. 14 in 2018, at No. 9 in 2019 as well as 2020.

Khurana was ranked in the Times Most Desirable Women on TV at No. 11 in 2019, at No. 17 in 2020.

In 2021, Himanshi became the first female Punjabi actor to feature at the New York's Times Square.

Filmography

Films

Television

Music videos

Discography

References

External links 

 
 

1991 births
Indian female models
Indian film actresses
Actresses in Punjabi cinema
Living people
Actresses from Ludhiana
Female models from Punjab, India
Bigg Boss (Hindi TV series) contestants